Saltcoats Victoria Football Club are a Scottish football club based in the town of Saltcoats, North Ayrshire. Nicknamed the Seasiders, the club were originally formed in 1889  and play at Campbell Park.

Saltcoats have always had a loyal support and locals have shown in the past they will turn out in numbers for big games. When Saltcoats twice reached the quarter final stage of the Scottish Junior Cup in the 1970s the home legs both attracted an estimated 3000+ supporters. Like many Junior Clubs Saltcoats rely on a hard working committee and sponsors to maintain revenue.

Campbell Park is now owned by North Ayrshire Council. The Grandstand was destroyed by a severe storm in the early 1970s. The changing rooms were maintained for some years after, but now the club relies on pre-fabricated facilities. After these facilities were deemed unsuitable, the club were forced to groundshare with local rivals Ardeer Thistle for three years before returning in 2011 with new 'vandal proof' facilities being installed.

The team are managed by Iain McMillan.

Honours
Scottish Junior Cup
Winners: 1924–25

Other Honours
West of Scotland Cup winners: 1945–46, 1946–47
Ayrshire First Division winners: 1923–24, 1925–26, 1926–27, 1938–39, 1945–46
Ayrshire Second Division winners: 1992–93
Ayrshire (Ardrossan & Saltcoats Herald) Cup: 1911–12, 1937–38, 1939–40, 1946–47
Ayrshire League (Kerr & Smith) Cup: 1926–27, 1932–33, 1937–38, 1945–46
Ayrshire District (Irvine Times) Cup: 1923–24, 1924–25, 1937–38, 1952–53
Western Junior League Cup: 1926–27
Irvine & District League: 1912–13

Former players

1. Players that have played/managed in the Scottish Football League or any foreign equivalent to this level (i.e. fully professional league).
2. Players with full international caps.
3. Players that hold a club record or have captained the club.
 David McKellar
 Raymond Montgomerie

References

External links

Football clubs in Scotland
Scottish Junior Football Association clubs
Football in North Ayrshire
Association football clubs established in 1911
West of Scotland Football League teams
Ardrossan−Saltcoats−Stevenston